Pyramodontinae is a subfamily of pearlfishes, of the family Carapidae. The subfamily consists of three genera:

Eurypleuron Matsubara, 1953
Pyramodon H. M. Smith & Radcliffe, 1913
Snyderidia C. H. Gilbert, 1905

References

Carapidae